Euceriodes wernickei is a species of moth in the subfamily Arctiinae first described by Max Wilhelm Karl Draudt in 1917. It is found in Santa Catarina, Brazil.

References

Moths described in 1917
Arctiini